Mordellistena nanula is a species of beetle in the genus Mordellistena of the family Mordellidae, which is part of the superfamily Tenebrionoidea. It was discovered in 1967.

References

Beetles described in 1967
nanula
Endemic fauna of Germany